Justin Fox (born January 28, 1964) is an American financial journalist, commentator, and writer. He is a Bloomberg Opinion columnist, writing about business and economics.

Early life and education
Fox was born in Morristown, New Jersey, a son of Joseph M. Fox and Elizabeth L. Fox.  He grew up in Lafayette, California, attending Acalanes High School. 

Fox graduated from Princeton University (BA, international affairs), and was a Rotary International Fellow at the University of Leiden. H Fox has been a Senior Fellow at the Mossavar-Rahmani Center for Business and Government at the Harvard Kennedy School.

Career
He became Bloomberg Opinion columnist, writing about business and economics. Formerly, he was editorial director of the Harvard Business Review Group for five years, and business and economics columnist for Time magazine. He has been published by Fortune magazine, The Birmingham News, and American Banker.

He was awarded the 2001 Business Journalist of the Year Award for writing about technology.

Fox's book, The Myth of the Rational Market (2009), traces the rise of the efficient-market hypothesis. It was a New York Times Notable Book of 2009, and was named the best business book of the year by Amazon.com.

He has worked as a commentator on PBS's Nightly Business Report. He is a Young Global Leader of the World Economic Forum.

Bibliography

Books

Articles

See also
 New Yorkers in journalism

References

External links

 Blogs.hbr.org
 Byjustinfox.com
 

1964 births
American financial commentators
American male journalists
Bloomberg L.P. people
Business commentators
Harvard Kennedy School alumni
Leiden University alumni
People from Lafayette, California
People from Morristown, New Jersey
Princeton University alumni
Time (magazine) people
Living people